Maxwell Valentine Noronha (14 February 1926 – 28 January 2018) was a Roman Catholic bishop.

Noronha was ordained to the priesthood in 1950. He served as bishop of the Roman Catholic Diocese of Calicut, India from 1980 to 2002.

Notes

1926 births
2018 deaths
21st-century Roman Catholic bishops in India
20th-century Roman Catholic bishops in India
People from Kozhikode